Scott Edward Twine (born 14 July 1999) is an English professional footballer who plays as a midfielder for EFL Championship club Burnley.

Early life
Born in Swindon, Twine started with the youth team of Royal Wootton Bassett Town before joining the academy of Southampton.

Career

Swindon Town
In 2013 he joined Swindon Town where he progressed through the academy system. He signed professional terms with the club in March 2017, and made his first team debut on the final day of the 2016–17 campaign as a 69th-minute substitute during Swindon’s 3–0 defeat away to Charlton Athletic.

During the following 2017–18 season, Twine enjoyed two loan spells with National League South club Chippenham Town, before being recalled for a second time to Swindon in March 2018. At the conclusion of the season, the club exercised an option to extend his contract further.

On 10 November 2018, Twine scored his first Swindon Town goal in a 2–1 home FA Cup third round victory over York City. After featuring regularly during the first half of the 2018–19 season, Twine joined League of Ireland Premier Division club Waterford on loan, and went on to score twice in 15 appearances. The following season he re-joined Chippenham Town on loan once again for a short period, this time scoring 6 goals in just 8 appearances.

In September 2020, Twine joined League Two club Newport County on a season-long loan deal. He enjoyed further success during this period and began to grow his reputation for scoring long range goals, including one in a 2–1 defeat away to Cambridge United, which was later named the EFL League Two Goal of the Month for October 2020.

With Swindon struggling in League One, Twine was recalled by his parent club from his loan in January 2021. Despite Swindon later being relegated to League Two at the end of the 2020–21 season, Twine had scored 14 goals in 49 appearances for both clubs, and was named Newport County’s Young Player of the Season.

Milton Keynes Dons
On 8 June 2021, Twine joined League One club Milton Keynes Dons on free transfer, signing a long-term contract after declining a new deal with Swindon. Due to being under the age of 24, Swindon were later awarded compensation which was set by a tribunal to be £300,000 in addition to a 20% sell-on clause for any future transfer.

He scored his first goal for the club - a free-kick on his league debut - in a 3–3 draw away to Bolton Wanderers on 7 August 2021. 

On 28 September 2021, Twine scored his first career hat-trick in a 3–3 draw at home to Fleetwood Town, with two of the goals long range efforts, including a free-kick. On 10 December 2021, Twine was named EFL League One Player of the Month for November 2021 following seven goal contributions in four appearances.

On 30 April 2022, the final day of the regular season, Twine scored 4 goals in a 5–0 win away over Plymouth Argyle, becoming only the second player in the club's history after Will Grigg to score four in a match. A day later, Twine was named both Young Player of the Year and Player of the Year at the club's annual end of season awards.

Following an impressive first season with the club in which he scored 20 goals and made 13 assists, Twine was named the EFL League One Player of the Season for the 2021–22 campaign at the annual EFL Awards ceremony, and was included in both the EFL's League One Team of the Season and PFA Team of the Year alongside teammate Harry Darling.

Burnley
On 26 June 2022, Twine joined EFL Championship club Burnley on a four-year contract for an undisclosed fee.

Style of play
Twine has a reputation for scoring long range goals from both open play and free-kicks. Primarily a number ten throughout his career to date, Twine can also operate as a left-winger or striker.

Career statistics

Honours
Individual
Newport County Young Player of the Season: 2020–21
EFL League One Player of the Month: November 2021
EFL League One Team of the Season: 2021–22
EFL League One Player of the Season: 2021–22
Milton Keynes Dons Young Player of the Year: 2021–22
Milton Keynes Dons Player of the Year:  2021–22
PFA Team of the Year: 2021–22 League One

References

External links

1999 births
Living people
Sportspeople from Swindon
English footballers
Association football forwards
Swindon Town F.C. players
Chippenham Town F.C. players
Waterford F.C. players
Newport County A.F.C. players
Milton Keynes Dons F.C. players
Burnley F.C. players
English Football League players
National League (English football) players
League of Ireland players
Expatriate association footballers in the Republic of Ireland
English expatriate footballers